Yevheniy Ruslanovych  Mohil (born 11 January 1999) is a Ukrainian professional footballer who plays as a striker for Nevėžis.

Career
Born in Kyiv, Mohil is a product of three of the city's youth academies. 

In January 2021, he signed on loan contract with Ukrainian Premier League side FC Olimpik Donetsk.

References

External links
 
 

1999 births
Living people
Footballers from Kyiv
Piddubny Olympic College alumni
Ukrainian footballers
Association football forwards
FC Volyn Lutsk players
FC Olimpik Donetsk players
FC Podillya Khmelnytskyi players
FC Rubikon Kyiv players
FK Nevėžis players
Ukrainian First League players
Ukrainian Second League players
Ukrainian Amateur Football Championship players
Ukrainian expatriate footballers
Expatriate footballers in Lithuania
Ukrainian expatriate sportspeople in Lithuania